Microphorites is an extinct genus of flies in the family Dolichopodidae.

Species
 †Microphorites deploegi Nel, Perrichot, Daugeron & Néraudeau, 2004 Charentese amber, France, Cenomanian
 †Microphorites erikai Bramuzzo & Nel, 2017 Oise amber, France, Ypresian
 †Microphorites extinctus Hennig, 1971 Lebanese amber, Barremian
 †Microphorites magaliae Perrichot & Engel, 2014 Vendée amber, France, Turonian
 †Microphorites moravicus Tkoč, Nel & Prokop, 2016 Studlov amber, Czech Republic, Paleocene
 †Microphorites oculeus Grimaldi & Cumming, 1999 Lebanese amber, Barremian
 †Microphorites pouilloni Ngô-Muller & Nel in Ngô-Muller, Garrouste, Pouillon & Nel, 2020 Burmese amber, Myanmar, Cenomanian
 †Microphorites similis Grimaldi & Cumming, 1999 Lebanese amber, Barremian
 †Microphorites utrillensis Peñalver in Arillo, Peñalver & Delclòs, 2008 San Just amber, Escucha Formation, Spain, Albian

References

†
†
Prehistoric Diptera genera
Taxa named by Willi Hennig
Cretaceous insects
Paleocene insects
Eocene insects